Blennidus liodes is a species of ground beetle in the subfamily Pterostichinae. It was described by Henry Walter Bates in 1891.

References

Blennidus
Beetles described in 1891